The National Union of Ships' Clerks, Grain Weighers and Coalmeters was a trade union in the United Kingdom.

The union was in existence by 1912, at which time it had branches in central London, Grays, Millwall, Southampton, Surrey Docks and Tilbury.  At the time, it was based in Plaistow and its secretary was G. N. Richmond.  Because of its location, it was also known as the "East Ham Union".  It merged with the Transport and General Workers' Union in 1922.

See also

 List of trade unions
 Transport and General Workers' Union
 TGWU amalgamations

References

Defunct trade unions of the United Kingdom
Port workers' trade unions
Transport and General Workers' Union amalgamations
Trade unions established in 1912
Trade unions disestablished in 1922
1912 establishments in the United Kingdom
Trade unions based in London